Akshar, "imperishable," "unalterable,"  "undestroyable," Atman, the one who is unchanging, forever beyond maya, is a term found in Indian Sanskrit scriptures. It is a prominent part of Swaminarayan Sampradaya's theology. It is contrasted with kshara, "destroyable," Prakṛti, bound by maya. Originally, akshar had the meaning of "syllable" in Sanskrit philosophy, but came to mean "first and fundamental principle of the cosmic order."

According to the Bhagavad Gita, Purushottam is explained as above and beyond kshar and akshar purushas or as an omnipotent cosmic being. For example, verses 15.16 and 15.17 of the Bhagavad Gita explain:

Notes

References

Sources

 
 

Hindu philosophical concepts